Ianthocincla is a genus of passerine birds in the family Leiothrichidae.

Taxonomy
The genus Ianthocincla was erected by English ornithologist and bird artist John Gould in 1835 with the spotted laughingthrush as the type species. The name of the genus combines the Ancient Greek ionthos  "young hair" or "down" with the New Latin cinclus "thrush". The species now placed in the genus were previously assigned to Garrulax but following the publication of a molecular phylogenetic study in 2018, Garrulax was split up and some of the species were moved to the resurrected genus Ianthocincla.

Species
The genus contains eight species:

References

 Collar, N. J. & Robson, C. 2007. Family Timaliidae (Babblers)  pp. 70 – 291 in; del Hoyo, J., Elliott, A. & Christie, D.A. eds. Handbook of the Birds of the World, Vol. 12. Picathartes to Tits and Chickadees. Lynx Edicions, Barcelona.

 
Bird genera
Leiothrichidae